The Lockheed/Boeing/General Dynamics YF-22 is an American single-seat, twin-engine fighter aircraft technology demonstrator designed for the United States Air Force (USAF). The design was a finalist in the USAF's Advanced Tactical Fighter competition, and two prototypes were built for the demonstration/validation phase of the competition. The YF-22 won the contest against the Northrop YF-23, and entered production as the Lockheed Martin F-22 Raptor. The YF-22 has a similar aerodynamic layout and configuration as the F-22, but with differences in the position and design of the cockpit, tail fins and wings, and in internal structural layout.

In the 1980s, the USAF began looking for a replacement for its fighter aircraft, especially to counter the advanced Su-27 and MiG-29. A number of companies, divided into two teams, submitted their proposals. Northrop and McDonnell Douglas submitted the YF-23. Lockheed, Boeing and General Dynamics proposed and built the YF-22, which, although marginally slower and having a larger radar cross-section, was more agile than the YF-23. Primarily, for this reason, it was picked by the Air Force as the winner of the ATF in April 1991. Following the selection, the first YF-22 was retired to a museum, while the second prototype continued flying until an accident relegated it to the role of an antenna test vehicle.

Design and development 

In 1981, the U.S. Air Force developed a requirement for an Advanced Tactical Fighter (ATF) as a new air superiority fighter to replace the F-15 Eagle and F-16 Fighting Falcon. This was made more crucial by the emerging worldwide threats, including development and proliferation of Soviet MiG-29 and Su-27 "Flanker"-class fighter aircraft. It would take advantage of the new technologies in fighter design on the horizon including composite materials, lightweight alloys, advanced flight-control systems, more powerful propulsion systems and stealth technology. In September 1985, the Air Force sent out technical request for proposals (RFP) to a number of aircraft manufacturing teams. The seven bids were submitted in July 1986, and two companies, Lockheed and Northrop, were selected on 31 October 1986. The two teams, Lockheed/Boeing/General Dynamics and Northrop/McDonnell Douglas, undertook a 50-month demonstration phase, culminating in the flight test of the two teams' prototypes, the YF-22 and the YF-23.

The YF-22 was designed to meet USAF requirements for survivability, supercruise, stealth, and ease of maintenance. Because Lockheed's submission was selected as one of the winners, the company, through its Skunk Works division, assumed leadership of the program partners. It would be responsible for the forward cockpit and fuselage, as well as final assembly at Palmdale, California. Meanwhile, the wings and aft fuselage would be built by Boeing, with the center fuselage, weapons bays, tail and landing gear built by General Dynamics. Compared with its Northrop/McDonnell Douglas counterpart, the YF-22 has a more conventional design – its wings have larger control surfaces, such as full-span trailing edge, and, whereas the YF-23 had two tail surfaces, the YF-22 had four, which made it more maneuverable than its counterpart. Two examples of each prototype air vehicle (PAV) were built for the Demonstration-Validation phase: one with General Electric YF120 engines, the other with Pratt & Whitney YF119 engines.

The YF-22 was given the unofficial name "Lightning II" after Lockheed's World War II-era fighter, the P-38 Lightning, which persisted until the mid-1990s when the USAF officially named the aircraft "Raptor". The F-35 later received the "Lightning II" name in 2006.

The first YF-22 (PAV-1, serial number 87-0700, N22YF), with the GE YF120, was rolled out on 29 August 1990 and first flew on 29 September 1990, taking off from Palmdale piloted by David L. Ferguson. Following the flight, Ferguson said that the remainder of the YF-22 test program would be concentrated on "the manoeuvrability of the aeroplane, both supersonic and subsonic". The second YF-22 (PAV-2, s/n 87-0701, N22YX) with the P&W YF119 made its maiden flight on 30 October at the hands of Tom Morgenfeld.

Operational history

Evaluation 

During the flight test program, unlike the YF-23, weapon firings and high (60°) angle of attack (AoA, or high-alpha) flights were carried out on the YF-22. Though not a requirement, the aircraft fired AIM-9 Sidewinder and AIM-120 AMRAAM missiles from internal weapon bays. Flight testing also demonstrated that the YF-22 with its thrust vectoring nozzles achieved pitch rates more than double that of the F-16 at low-speed maneuvering. The first prototype, PAV-1, achieved Mach 1.58 in supercruise, while PAV-2 reached a maximum supercruise speed of Mach 1.43; maximum speed was in excess of Mach 2.0. Flight testing continued until 28 December 1990, by which time 74 flights were completed and 91.6 airborne hours were accumulated. Following flight testing, the contractor teams submitted proposals for ATF production.

On 23 April 1991, the YF-22 was announced by Secretary of the Air Force Donald Rice as the winner of the ATF competition. The YF-23 design was stealthier and faster, but the YF-22 was more agile. It was speculated in the aviation press that the YF-22 was also seen as more adaptable to the Navy's Navalized Advanced Tactical Fighter (NATF), but the US Navy abandoned NATF by 1992. Instead of being retired, as with the case of PAV-1, PAV-2 subsequently flew sorties following the competition – it amassed another 61.6 flying hours during 39 flights. On 25 April 1992, the aircraft sustained serious damage during a landing attempt as a result of pilot-induced oscillations. It was repaired but never flew again, and instead served as a static test vehicle thereafter. In 1991, it was anticipated that 650 production F-22s would be procured.

F-22 production 

As the Lockheed team won the ATF competition, it was awarded the engineering, manufacturing and development (EMD) contract, which would ultimately allow it to proceed with production of operational aircraft. The EMD called for seven single-seat F-22A and two twin-seat F-22Bs. On 9 April 1997, the first of these, Spirit of America, was rolled out. During the ceremony, the F-22 was officially named "Raptor". Due to limited funding, the first flight, which had previously been scheduled for mid-1996, occurred on 7 September 1997. Flight testing for the F-22 continued until 2005, and on 15 December 2005 the USAF announced that the Raptor had reached its initial operational capability (IOC).

In many respects, the YF-22s were different from production F-22s. Contrary to the F-117 Nighthawk, which was initially difficult to control because of small vertical stabilizers, Lockheed over-specified the fin area on its YF-22. Therefore, the company reduced the size of those on F-22s by 20–30 percent. Lockheed recontoured the shape of the wing and stabilator trailing edges to improve aerodynamics, strength, and stealth characteristics; the wing and stabilitor sweep was reduced by 6° from 48°. Finally, to improve pilot visibility, the canopy was moved forward , and the engine intakes were moved rearward .

Accidents
In April 1992, the second YF-22 crashed while landing at Edwards AFB. The test pilot, Tom Morgenfeld, escaped without injury. The cause of the crash was found to be a flight control software error that failed to prevent a pilot-induced oscillation.

Surviving aircraft

87-0700 – Air Force Flight Test Center Museum, Edwards Air Force Base, California
87-0701 – Rome Laboratory, Rome, New York.

Specifications (YF-22)

See also

References

Notes

Bibliography

Additional sources

External links

 F-22 official team web site
 F-22 page on NASA Langley site
 F-22 page on GlobalSecurity.org

F-022
1990s United States fighter aircraft
Twinjets
Stealth aircraft
1990s United States experimental aircraft
Mid-wing aircraft
Aircraft first flown in 1990